Radio Mashaal is a member of Radio Free Europe in Pakistan. It was launched on 15 January 2010. It broadcasts in the Pashto language. Its headquarters are both in Prague, Czech Republic. The Radio Mashaal office in Islamabad was closed by the Government of Pakistan on January 19, 2018.

References

External links
Official website

 

Radio stations established in 2010
Radio Free Europe/Radio Liberty
Pashto mass media
Mass media in Islamabad